Christopher Gordon Blandford Wood (24 June 1944 – 12 July 1983) was a British rock musician, best known as a founding member of the rock band Traffic, along with Steve Winwood, Jim Capaldi and Dave Mason.

Career 
Born in Quinton, a suburb of Birmingham, Chris Wood had an interest in music and painting from early childhood. Self-taught on flute and saxophone, which he began playing at the age of 15, he began to play locally with other Birmingham musicians who would later find international fame in music: Christine Perfect (later Christine McVie), Carl Palmer, Stan Webb and Mike Kellie. Wood played with Perfect in 1964 in the band Shades of Blue and with Kellie during 1965–1966 in the band Locomotive.

He attended the Stourbridge College of Art, then the Birmingham School of Art (Painting Dept.) and subsequently was awarded a grant to attend the Royal Academy of Art starting in December 1965.

Aged 18, Wood joined the Steve Hadley Quartet, a jazz/blues group in 1962. His younger sister Stephanie designed clothes for the Spencer Davis Group, based in Birmingham, and it was through her that Wood was first introduced to fellow Birmingham native Steve Winwood. A well-known Birmingham club, the Elbow Room, was an after-hours haunt of local bands and musicians and it was here that Wood used to meet up with Winwood and Jim Capaldi. At the age of 18, Winwood abandoned the Spencer Davis Group at the height of their popularity and, along with Wood, Capaldi and Dave Mason, formed Traffic.

To focus his fledgling band, Island Records' founder Chris Blackwell arranged for the four to retreat to an isolated farmhouse on the Berkshire Downs near Aston Tirrold. Initially without electricity, telephone or running water, The Cottage (as it became universally known) was so remote that a generator had to be installed to power the group's equipment. A concrete outdoor stage was built with the band's stage equipment set up to overlook the surrounding fields. After six months honing their music, Traffic released their first single, "Paper Sun".

In Traffic, Wood primarily played flute and saxophone, occasionally contributing keyboards, bass and vocals. Wood also co-wrote several of Traffic's songs, particularly during the earlier period of the band's recording career. His most notable contribution is as the co-writer (with Winwood and Capaldi), of "Dear Mr. Fantasy".

Wood introduced the 17th century traditional song "John Barleycorn" to the band after hearing it on The Watersons album Frost and Fire. It became the title song of their 1970 album, "John Barleycorn Must Die."

Wood played with Jimi Hendrix in 1968, appearing on Electric Ladyland. When Winwood temporarily formed supergroup Blind Faith in 1969, Wood, Mason and Capaldi joined Mick Weaver otherwise known as Wynder K Frog, to become Mason, Capaldi, Wood and Frog. He then went on to tour the United States with Dr. John, where he met singer Jeanette Jacobs (formerly of the 1960s girl group The Cake). Wood and Jacobs married in November 1972, at Kensington Registry Office, when he was 28 and she was 22.

In 1969, Wood also appeared on the eponymous second album of Free and the Small Faces' The Autumn Stone. In 1970, Wood and his wife, along with Steve Winwood, joined Ginger Baker's Air Force, releasing one album before reforming Traffic. Wood remained with Traffic from the time of its 1970 reformation until its 1974 breakup. He played on John Martyn's Inside Out (1973). Throughout Traffic's life, Chris was also in demand as a session musician with his immediately identifiable flute or saxophone playing cropping up on albums by Rebop Kwaku Baah, Tyrone Downie, Fat Mattress, Gordon Jackson, Crawler, The Sky, Bobby Whitlock and others.

Through much of his life, Wood suffered from addiction to drugs and alcohol, which were initially attributed to a fear of flying. His wife was unfaithful while he was on tour, leading to an increased drinking, culminating in liver disease. He cut down on drinking, but his medication caused further complications. His wife Jeanette, from whom he had separated, died in 1982, at the age of 31, from the effects of a seizure. Wood was profoundly affected by her death.

Death and legacy 
The death of two close friends, Free's Paul Kossoff and former bandmate Rebop Kwaku Baah, along with that of his (by then, estranged) wife lay very heavy on Wood.

In 1983, Wood died of liver disease at Queen Elizabeth Hospital in Birmingham.

At the time, he was working on a solo album that was to be titled Vulcan, and had recorded material for the album over the previous few years, mostly in London at Island's Hammersmith Studio, The Fall Out Shelter, with engineer Terry Barham, as well as at Pathway Studios in London. Following Wood's death, the Vulcan recordings remained in the possession of Wood's sister, Stephanie. In 2008, with the consent of Stephanie Wood a CD titled Vulcan, consisting of selected material Wood recorded while working on the incomplete album (plus an unreleased Traffic live performance of one of Wood's compositions), was released by Esoteric Recordings.

Traffic recorded one additional studio album, Far from Home (1994), after Wood's death. The album is dedicated to him, and the central figure on its front cover is a stick figure of a man playing flute.

In June 2013, on Wood's 69th birthday, the Chris Wood Estate (run by his sister, Stephanie) announced that a commemorative box set was being prepared – in collaboration with contemporary music archivists HiddenMasters, to properly honour Wood's life in music. Among other music, the set would include the album Vulcan as Chris originally sequenced it in 1978.  The box set Evening Blue was finally released three and a half years later in early 2017, in a special deluxe first edition limited to 1,000 copies.

Discography

Solo 
2008 Vulcan (compilation)
2015 Evening Blue (box set)

with Traffic 
Mr. Fantasy (1967)
Traffic (1968)
Last Exit (1969)
Best of Traffic (1969)
John Barleycorn Must Die (1970)
The Low Spark of High Heeled Boys (1971)
Welcome to the Canteen (1971)
Shoot Out at the Fantasy Factory (1973)
On the Road (1973)
When the Eagle Flies (1974)
Heavy Traffic (1975)
More Heavy Traffic (1975)
Smiling Phases (1991)
Heaven Is In Your Mind – An Introduction To Traffic (1998)
Feelin' Alright: The Very Best Of Traffic (2000)
The Collection (2002)
The Best Of Traffic – The Millennium Collection (2003)
Traffic Gold (2005)

with Ginger Baker's Air Force 
Ginger Baker's Air Force (1970)
Ginger Baker, Do What You Like (Compilation of Ginger Baker's first three albums, including Ginger Baker's Air Force) (1998)

with Others 
Electric Ladyland (The Jimi Hendrix Experience, 1968)
Free (Free, 1969)
Fat Mattress (Fat Mattress, 1969)
Fiends and Angels (Martha Velez, 1969)
O.K. Ken? (Chicken Shack, 1969)
Thinking Back (Gordon Jackson, 1969)
We Are Everything You See (Locomotive, 1969)
Contribution (Shawn Phillips, 1970)
Don't Hold Back (There In The Greenbriar) (Sky, 1970)
The Cry of Love (Jimi Hendrix, 1971)
Winwood (Compilation of Winwood's activities from 1966 to 1970, including material from Traffic) (Steve Winwood, 1971)
Oh How We Danced (Jim Capaldi, 1972)
Rebop (Reebop Kwaku Baah, 1972)
Inside Out (John Martyn, 1973)
Now Hear This (Hanson, 1973)
Music from Free Creek (Free Creek, 1973; re-released 1976 as Summit Meeting)
Short Cut Draw Blood (Jim Capaldi, 1975)
96 Degrees In The Shade (Third World, 1977)
Crawler (Crawler, 1977)
The Story's Been Told (Third World, 1979)
Funky (Spencer Davis Group, 1997)

References

External links 
Chris Wood official website
Tribute to Chris Wood on Jim Capaldi website
Biography

1944 births
1983 deaths
English rock saxophonists
English rock flautists
Ginger Baker's Air Force members
Traffic (band) members
Musicians from Birmingham, West Midlands
20th-century English musicians
Deaths from pneumonia in England
English jazz flautists
English jazz saxophonists
British male saxophonists
20th-century saxophonists
British male jazz musicians
20th-century British male musicians
20th-century flautists